Maciej Roman Gdula (born 20 May 1977) is a Polish sociologist specializing in social theory and political theory, as well as opinion journalist and politician.

Biography 
He is the son of Andrzej Gdula, deputy interior minister of the Polish People's Republic in the 1980s, and later adviser to President Aleksander Kwaśniewski.

Gdula obtained a PhD in sociology in 2006 at the Faculty of Philosophy and Sociology at the University of Warsaw. There, in 2016 he received the postdoctoral degree in social sciences in the field of sociology and became an adjunct at the Institute of Sociology at the University of Warsaw.

For several years, he has been a member of the Stanisław Brzozowski Association, a non-profit organization coordinating the actions of Krytyka Polityczna. He was a member of the Association's Board (2005–2010), and a member of its Audit Committee (2010–2015). As an opinion journalist, he contributed to Krytyka Polityczna, as well as to Tok FM Radio morning broadcasts, of which he was a frequent guest.

In 2017, he was the coordinator of a field study in Miastko, one of the poviat towns in Mazovia. The report of this study was considered by several sociologists the first authoritative diagnosis of the reasons for the victory of Law and Justice in the 2015 Polish parliamentary election.

In May 2019, Gdula became an expert of the Spring party and the leader of its list in the European Parliament election, in the district covering the Lesser Poland and Świętokrzyskie voivodships, but did not win a seat. In October 2019, he became member of the Sejm of the Republic of Poland.

Books 
 Trzy dyskursy miłosne (2009)
 Style życia i porządek klasowy w Polsce (2012, with Przemysław Sadura)
 Oprogramowanie rzeczywistości społecznej (2014, with Lech Nijakowski)
 Uspołecznienie i kompozycja. Dwie tradycje myśli społecznej a współczesne teorie krytyczne (2015)
 Dobra zmiana w Miastku. Neoautorytaryzm w polskiej polityce z perspektywy małego miasta (2017, with Katarzyna Dębska and Kamil Trepka)

References 

Polish sociologists
Polish opinion journalists
University of Warsaw alumni
Academic staff of the University of Warsaw
People from Żywiec
1977 births
Living people
Members of the Polish Sejm 2019–2023